New Year Adventures of Masha and Vitya is a 1975 Soviet children's film directed by Igor Usov and Gennadi Kazansky.

Plot 
Elementary school children Vitya and Masha are complete opposites; Vitya believes only in science and technology, while Masha believes in miracles. During the hall's preparation for the New Year at their school, Masha brings to life the sculpture of Father Frost with a magic spell, who transports her and Vitya to a fairy-tale world to save the Snow Maiden: Koschei kidnapped the Snow Maiden to arrange the New Year for his evil spirits.

Father Frost gives the children three tips: One, do not wait for anyone to help, but help everyone in need, 2) do not get lost in a difficult moment and 3) hold on to each other when in a bad situation. Learning this, Koschey sends them an impure force – the vocal-instrumental trio "Wild Guitars": Baba Yaga, Leshy and Wild Cat Matvei. Masha and Vitya fly away on a mortar and pestle from Baba Yaga. Vitya strikes Leshy with a self-made electroshock weapon. He also distracts Wild Cat Matvei, who runs around the forest with a big slingshot, using a mechanical mouse.

On the way to Koschei's kingdom, Masha and Vitya also meet the Stove, the Apple Tree and Old Man-Forester and help them, and in return they show the children the way with the help of charcoal, an apple and a ball. But at the last moment Koshchei abducts Masha and lowers her on the elevator to his dungeon. Soon it turns out that Koshchei's teeth hurt, and Masha relieves the sorcerer's toothache with a healing rinse in exchange for the Snow Maiden's release. Vitya summons Koshchei to a duel and defeats him with an ordinary magnet. The "Wild Guitars" trio go in pursuit of children, but the Stove, the Apple Tree and Old Man-Forester help Vitya and Masha, and they return to school with the Snow Maiden, where children and Father Frost are waiting for them.

Cast 
Natasha Simonova – Masha
Yura Nakhratov – Vitya
Igor Efimov – Father Frost
Irina Borisova – The Snow Maiden
George Shtil – Leshy
Vera Titova – Stove
Mikhail Boyarsky – Wild-Cat Matvei
Nikolai Boyarsky – Koschei the Immortal
Valentina Kosobutskaya – Baba Yaga
Lyubov Virolainen – Apple Tree
Boris Smolkin – Forester

References

External links 

Films set around New Year
1970s children's fantasy films
1970s children's adventure films
Russian children's fantasy films
Films based on Slavic mythology
Films scored by Gennady Gladkov
Soviet musical films
Lenfilm films
Films based on fairy tales
Films directed by Gennadi Kazansky
Soviet children's films